Army Men: Soldiers of Misfortune is a third-person shooter video game developed by Big Blue Bubble and published by Zoo Games for Wii, Nintendo DS and PlayStation 2, becoming a Nintendo exclusive in Europe. It is the latest home console game in the Army Men series and the only one to be released on seventh-generation platforms. It is a major departure from prior games in the series in that players assume the role of Private Timmy Reynolds who plays with toy soldiers instead of the toy soldiers themselves, shrinking down to their size to participate in a war among them. The game includes 15 levels and a variety of weapons provided by the player.

Reception

Army Men: Soldiers of Misfortune received negative reviews. Aggregating review website GameRankings and Metacritic gave the Nintendo DS version 36.20% and 35/100, the Wii version 35.00% and the PlayStation 2 version 22.50%.

References

External links

2008 video games
Army Men
Nintendo DS games
Platform games
PlayStation 2 games
Single-player video games
Third-person shooters
Video games developed in Canada
Wii games
Video games about size change
Big Blue Bubble games